Henry Adrian Austin (born 31 October 1972) is a Barbadian cricketer. He played in one first-class match for the Barbados cricket team in 1996/97.

See also
 List of Barbadian representative cricketers

References

External links
 

1972 births
Living people
Barbadian cricketers
Barbados cricketers